The United States Congress designated the Bell Mountain Wilderness in 1980. Bell Mountain is located within the Potosi-Fredericktown Ranger District of the Mark Twain National Forest, south of Potosi, Missouri in the United States. The wilderness lies in the Saint Francois Mountains and it was named after its highest point, Bell Mountain (elevation: 1,702). The namesake Bell Mountain has the name of Henry Bell, a pioneer settler. The Bell Mountain Wilderness is one of eight wilderness areas protected and preserved in Missouri.

Bell Mountain Wilderness is part of a large parks-and-wilderness area which includes Johnson's Shut-Ins State Park, Taum Sauk Mountain State Park, and several conservation areas.

See also 

 List of mountain peaks of Missouri
Devils Backbone Wilderness
Hercules-Glades Wilderness
Irish Wilderness
Mingo Wilderness
Paddy Creek Wilderness
Piney Creek Wilderness
Rockpile Mountain Wilderness

References

External links 
 

Wilderness areas of Missouri
Protected areas of Iron County, Missouri
IUCN Category Ib
Mountains of Missouri
St. Francois Mountains
Protected areas established in 1980
Mark Twain National Forest